Blagg is an English surname and it may refer to:

 Alicia Blagg, English diver
 Edward Blagg, English cricketer
 Mary Adela Blagg, English astronomer
 Max Blagg, English poet
 Paul Blagg, English race walker
 Curtis Blagg, American IT Specialist

Fictional characters 
 Temiri Blagg, a minor character in the film Star Wars: Episode VIII - The Last Jedi